512 may refer to:

AD 512, a year in the 6th century AD
512 BC, a year in the 6th century BC
512 (number), a natural number
Several Ferrari cars: the 512 S and 512 M racing cars, and the 512 BB and 512 BBi, 512 TR and F512 M road cars
512 Taurinensis, a minor planet orbiting the Sun
The area code 512 (Austin, Texas area)

See also
5-12 (disambiguation)